Forbes State Forest is a Pennsylvania state forest in Pennsylvania Bureau of Forestry District #4.  The main offices are located in Laughlintown in Westmoreland County, Pennsylvania in the United States.  Mount Davis, the highest peak in Pennsylvania, is located in the forest. 

The forest was named in honor of General John Forbes. It includes 20 separate tracts of land and covers over  that stretch across Fayette, Somerset, and Westmoreland Counties. The designated forest tracts generally follow one of the area's dominant terrain features, Laurel Ridge, part of the Laurel Highlands.

History
Forbes State Forest was formed as a direct result of the depletion of the forests of Pennsylvania that took place during the mid-to-late 19th century. Conservationists like Dr. Joseph Rothrock became concerned that the forests would not regrow if they were not managed properly. Lumber and iron companies had harvested the old-growth forests for various reasons. They clear cut the forests and left behind nothing but dried tree tops and rotting stumps. The sparks of passing steam locomotives of the Pittsburgh, Westmoreland and Somerset Railroad ignited wildfires that prevented the formation of second growth forests. The conservationists feared that the forest would never regrow if there was not a change in the philosophy of forest management. They called for the state to purchase land from the lumber and iron companies and the lumber and iron companies were more than willing to sell their land since that had depleted the natural resources of the forests. The changes began to take place in 1895 when Dr. Rothrock was appointed the first commissioner of the Pennsylvania Department of Forests and Waters, the forerunner of today's Pennsylvania Department of Conservation and Natural Resources. The Pennsylvania General Assembly passed a piece of legislation in 1897 that authorized the purchase of "unseated lands for forest reservations." This was the beginning of the State Forest system.

Facilities

In order to accommodate visitors, the state has allowed the development of 9 areas within Forbes. This includes 6 State Parks and 3 State Forest Picnic Areas. The remainder of the area is undeveloped except for hiking trails maintained by the state. These are generally closed to vehicles but open to hiking, cross-country skiing, hunting, and fishing. Several portions of what is now designated as part of the Forbes State Forest had previously been either developed or commercially exploited through logging through the early-to-mid-20th century. These areas have been allowed, and sometimes encouraged, to return to their natural state.

Neighboring state forest districts
The U.S. states of Maryland and West Virginia are to the south and west, respectively
Clear Creek State Forest (north)
Gallitzin State Forest (northeast)
Buchanan State Forest (east)

Nearby state parks
Kooser State Park
Laurel Hill State Park
Laurel Mountain State Park
Laurel Ridge State Park
Laurel Summit State Park
Linn Run State Park
Ohiopyle State Park

Natural features
Forbes State Forest lies within the Appalachian mixed mesophytic forests ecoregion. It also includes a number of important natural features and points of interest:

Roaring Run Natural Area
After previous development and logging, this portion of the west slope of Laurel Ridge is currently undergoing reforestation. It is compromised largely of second and third growth mixed mesophytic forest. Roaring Run feeds into Indian Creek, which is a tributary of the Youghiogheny River.

Mt. Davis Natural Area
Mt. Davis is the highest point in  Pennsylvania. The area eventually drains into the Casselman River, a part of the Mississippi River watershed (via the Youghiogheny, Monongahela, and Ohio Rivers). One of the natural attractions of the area is the presence of small concentric stone rings which result from frost heaving in small patches of earth which are softer than the ground surrounding them. Frost causing the patches to be pushed up higher than their surroundings is followed by the effects of natural erosion which results in stones sliding to the bottom of the protrusion and forming ring-like patterns at the base.

Spruce Flats Wildlife Management Area

The area had previously passed through the successional sequence from open water to (eventually) forest. This process was actually reversed in the early part of the 20th century by a combination of clear-cutting the forest, and fires which burned away much of the forest floor. This resulted in a return to the swamp or bog stage of development, and the area is now slowly proceeding back into the forest stage. The bog currently hosts a large community of cranberry, pitcher plant, sundew, and cotton grass.

References

 Note: As of July 2006, this web page has not been updated to reflect the Pennsylvania State Forest Districts realignment.
 Note: Map showing districts after the July 1, 2005 realignment

External links
 www.stateparks.com: Forbes State Forest

Pennsylvania state forests
Laurel Highlands
Protected areas of Fayette County, Pennsylvania
Protected areas of Somerset County, Pennsylvania
Protected areas of Westmoreland County, Pennsylvania